Salix nakamurana is a rare species of willow native to alpine slopes of central Japan. It is a deciduous small prostrate shrub.

References

nakamurana